was a Japanese anime screenwriter from Tokyo. Shimada was a graduate of Waseda University. She made her screenwriting debut in 1980. 

She died in 2017, aged 58, from undisclosed causes.

Filmography
 Urusei Yatsura (1981 TV series), Screenplay
 Dr. Slump and Arale-chan (1981 TV series), Script
 Dr. Slump: "Hoyoyo!" Space Adventure (1982 film), Screenplay
 World Famous Fairy Tale Series  (1983 short films), Script
 Dr. Slump and Arale-chan: Hoyoyo! The Treasure of Nanaba Castle (1984 film), Screenplay
 Okawari-Boy Starzan S (1984 TV series), Screenplay
 Dr. Slump and Arale-chan: Hoyoyo! City of Dreams, Mechapolis (1985 film), Screenplay
 Choushinsei Flashman (1986 TV series), Script
 Roots Search (1986 OVA), Screenplay
 Maison Ikkoku: Kanketsuhen (1988 film), Script
 Peter Pan no Bōken (1989 TV series), Script
 Gdleen (1990 OVA), Screenplay
 Future GPX Cyber Formula (1991 TV series), Screenplay
 Spirit of Wonder (1992 OVA), Screenplay
 Flanders no Inu, Boku no Patrasche (1992 TV series), Script
 Wakakusa Monogatari Nan to Jou Sensei (1993 TV series), Script
 You're Under Arrest (1994 OVA), Screenplay
 Kindaichi Case Files (1996 film), Screenplay
 Rurouni Kenshin (1996 TV series), Screenplay
 You're Under Arrest (1996 TV series), Screenplay
 Ie Naki Ko Remi (1996 TV series), Script
 Gegege no Kitarō: Obake Nighter (1997 film), Screenplay
 Doctor Slump (1997 TV series), Script
 Kindaichi Case Files (1997 TV series), Storyboard
 One Piece (1999 TV series), Script, Storyboard
 The Aurora (2000 film), Screenplay
 Tottoko Hamtaro (2000 TV series), Script
 One Piece: The Movie (2000 film), Script
 Tottoko Hamutaro: Ham Ham Ham~Jya! Maboroshi no Princess (2002 film), Scenario
 Gakuen Alice (2004 TV series), Script
 The Snow Queen (2005 TV series), Script
 Koi suru Tenshi Angelique ~ Kokoro no Mezameru Toki ~ (2006 TV series), Script (ep 1, 2, 3), Series Organization
 Koi suru Tenshi Angelique ~ Kagayaki no Ashita ~ (2007 TV series), Series Composition
 Emily of New Moon (2007 TV series), Series Composition, Screenplay
 Nanatsuiro Drops (2007 TV series), Series Composition, Script (ep 1–4, 7, 11–12)
 Shugo Chara! (2007 TV series), Series Composition, Script (ep 1, 2, 7, 13, 17, 23, 25, 32, 36, 42, 51)
Kon'nichiwa Anne: Before Green Gables (2009 TV series), Series Composition, Script
 Little Witch Academia: The Enchanted Parade (2015 short film), Screenplay
 Little Witch Academia (2017 TV series), Screenplay

References

External links
 

1959 births
2017 deaths
Anime screenwriters
Japanese screenwriters
Japanese women screenwriters
Waseda University alumni
Writers from Tokyo